John Joseph Rodriguez (born January 20, 1978) is a retired Major League Baseball Player. He played in the Major Leagues for the St. Louis Cardinals from 2005 to 2006.

Career
Rodriguez attended Brandeis High School. He signed as an undrafted free agent by the Yankees in 1996. Rodriguez played in the Yankees minor league system for eight seasons before signing with the Cleveland Indians in 2005. He was traded to the St. Louis Cardinals later that year and forced a major league call-up to replace the injured Reggie Sanders by hitting .342 with 17 home runs in 34 games with Triple-A the Memphis Redbirds. He performed well enough that the Cardinals signed him to a one-year contract following the season. On July 20, 2005, Rodriguez hit his first career home run off Ben Sheets of the Milwaukee Brewers.

Rodriguez got more playing time for the  Cardinals (183 at-bats, 34 more than the year before) and was on the postseason roster, winning a World Series ring when the Cardinals won the 2006 World Series.

On November 30, the Cardinals designated Rodriguez for assignment, removing him from the 40-man roster to make room for newly acquired shortstop, César Izturis. Shortly thereafter the team released him.

Rodriguez signed a minor league contract with the Tampa Bay Rays on January 4, but did not make the major league team out of spring training. On June 2, 2008, Rodriguez was released. On June 8, Rodriguez signed a minor league contract with the New York Mets and was assigned to Triple-A New Orleans.

On January 6, Rodriguez signed a minor league contract with the New York Yankees. After playing the entire season with the Scranton/Wilkes Barre Yankees, he became a free agent. On May 7, 2010 signed with the Long Island Ducks. On March 2, 2011, he signed a contract with the Long Island Ducks. In May 2012, signed to play for the Wichita Wingnuts in the American Association. Rodriguez played for the Wingnuts during the 2013 season as well.

John is the Head of Baseball Operations and the Head Hitting Instructor at the Yorkville Baseball Academy where he preaches The Art of Hand Path to his students.

References

External links

1978 births
Living people
African-American baseball players
American expatriate baseball players in Mexico
Baseball players from New York (state)
Buffalo Bisons (minor league) players
Columbus Clippers players
Diablos Rojos del México players
Durham Bulls players
Greensboro Bats players
Gulf Coast Yankees players
Long Island Ducks players
Major League Baseball outfielders
Memphis Redbirds players
Mexican League baseball first basemen
Mexican League baseball outfielders
New Orleans Zephyrs players
Norwich Navigators players
Rojos del Águila de Veracruz players
Scranton/Wilkes-Barre Yankees players
St. Louis Cardinals players
Tampa Yankees players
Wichita Wingnuts players
21st-century African-American sportspeople
20th-century African-American sportspeople